Legends Row: Mississauga Walk of Fame is the City of Mississauga's walk of fame.

Inductees
 Billy Talent, inducted in 2015
 Johnny Bower, inducted in 2013
 Don Cherry, inducted in 2014
 Gary Clipperton, inducted in 2017
 Paul Coffey, inducted in 2016
 Chuck Ealey, inducted in 2015
 Orey Fidani (1929 — 2000), inducted in 2016
 Robert Gillespie, inducted in 2015
 Sandy Hawley, inducted in 2014
 Paul Henderson, inducted in 2013
 George Hunter (1921–2013), inducted in 2014
 Tommy Hunter, inducted in 2013
 Dr. Ruth Hussey (1915—1984), inducted in 2017
 Chuck Jackson, inducted in 2013
 Iggy Kaneff, inducted in 2015
 Elliott Kerr, inducted in 2014
 Silken Laumann, inducted in 2013
 Ron Lenyk (1947 - 2015), inducted in 2015
 Hazel McCallion, inducted in 2017
 Bruce McLaughlin (1926–2012), inducted in 2013
 Wilson McTavish, inducted in 2017
 Laurie Pallett, inducted in 2014
 Lata Pata, inducted in 2013
 Oscar Peterson (1925 - 2007), inducted in 2013
 Fran Rider, inducted in 2015
 Dr. Colin Saldanha, inducted in 2016
 Robert J. Sawyer, inducted in 2017
 Harold G. Shipp (1926–2014), inducted in 2014
 George Stroumboulopoulos, inducted in 2015
 Dave Toycen, inducted in 2016
 Triumph, inducted in 2013
 John Tuzo Wilson (1908 — 1993), inducted in 2016
 Dr. Joseph Wong (1954 - 2014), inducted in 2013
 John Wood (1950—2013), inducted in 2017

References

Walks of fame
Culture of Mississauga